Myo Ko Tun (born 9 March 1995) is a Burmese professional footballer who plays as a midfielder for Yadanarbon FC and Myanmar national team. He had played in U-19 national football team.

Early life
Myo Ko Tun is born on 9 March 1995 in Pakokku, Magway Division. In 2009, he joined the Myanmar Football Academy in Mandalay.

Career

Yadanarbon FC
Myo Ko Tun has played for Yadanarbon FC since 2015. He was runner-up with the club in 2015 and celebrated the Myanmar soccer championship in 2016.

Shan United FC
Beginning of the 2023, Myo Ko Tun completely moved to Shan United from his Yadanarbon.

National team
Myo Ko Tun debuted in U-19 national football team in 2016. He made his national team debut on 29 March 2016 in a World Cup qualifier against Lebanon. Here he was in the starting lineup and was replaced by Kyaw Zin Lwin in the 79th minute.

Club
Yadanabon FC(1): 2014 (MNL) :2016(MNL)

Awards
Hassanal Bolkiah Trophy (1): 2014

References

2.Myanmar Football Lovers

1995 births
Living people
Burmese footballers
Myanmar international footballers
Association football forwards
Yadanarbon F.C. players
People from Mandalay Region